Lucia Contini Anselmi (15 October 1876 – after 1913) was an Italian pianist and composer. She was born in Vercelli and studied piano with Giovanni Sgambati and composition with Alessandro Parisotti at the Conservatory in Rome. After completing her studies, she toured as a concert pianist. She received a gold medal for Ludentia at the International Competition for Composers at Perugia in 1913.

Works
Anselmi's works include compositions for orchestra, solo piano, violin and cello. Selected works include:

Prelude
Gavotte
Minuet
Sonata for Piano in C minor
Sibylla Cumaea
Ludentia
Inno guerresco

References

1876 births
19th-century women composers
20th-century women composers
Italian Romantic composers
Italian classical composers
Italian classical pianists
Italian women pianists
Women classical composers
Women classical pianists
People from Vercelli
Year of death missing
19th-century women pianists
20th-century women pianists